Valley Township is a township in Barber County, Kansas, United States.  As of the 2000 census, its population was 183.

Geography

The stream of Chicken Creek runs through this township.

Transportation
Valley Township contains one airport or landing strip, Van Rankin Landing Strip.

References
 USGS Geographic Names Information System (GNIS)

External links
 City-Data.com

Townships in Barber County, Kansas
Townships in Kansas